Elmadağ is a quarter in Şişli, Istanbul, Turkey. 

Among well-known buildings in the quarter are five-star hotels like Ritz-Carlton and Hilton Istanbul Bosphorus, and along Cumhuriyet Caddesi many foreign airlines have their offices. The Surp Agop (Saint Jacob) Armenian Hospital is also on the same avenue.

References

Şişli
Quarters in Istanbul